The Courthouse Historic District in Kalispell, Montana is a  historic district which was listed on the National Register of Historic Places in 1994.  It included 18 contributing buildings and one contributing site.

It includes the 800-1000 blocks of Main St. in Kalispell.

It includes the Flathead County Courthouse, built in 1903.  It includes the two-story, flat-roofed Waggener & Campbell Funeral Home designed by architect Fred Brinkman.

References

Historic districts on the National Register of Historic Places in Montana
Government buildings completed in 1903
National Register of Historic Places in Flathead County, Montana
County courthouses in Montana
Kalispell, Montana
Courthouses on the National Register of Historic Places in Montana
1903 establishments in Montana